The Designing Women Reunion is a 2003 American television special that reunited the cast of the 1986–1993 sitcom Designing Women. It originally aired on Lifetime on July 28, 2003.

Summary
A retrospective of Designing Women reuniting original cast members Dixie Carter, Annie Potts, Delta Burke, Jean Smart and Meshach Taylor for the first time in 12 years. They reminisce about their time together on the series and about their characters. The special includes a compilation of clips highlighting the show's memorable moments, topics such as initial casting, favorite episodes, how the women met their real-life husbands on the show and Burke openly discussing her battle with depression and panic attacks prior to her departure from the series.

Also featured is a special appearance by Alice Ghostley, new interviews with crew members and series creators/producers Linda Bloodworth-Thomason and Harry Thomason; recurring cast members Hal Holbrook, Richard Gilliland, Gerald McRaney and writer/executive producer Pamela Norris share their memories of the show in pre-recorded separate interviews.

The special was taped on June 4, 2003 in front of a live audience at CBS Studio Center in Studio City, California.

Cast

Main cast

 Dixie Carter
 Annie Potts
 Delta Burke
 Jean Smart
 Meshach Taylor

Guest stars

 Alice Ghostley
 Linda Bloodworth-Thomason

Interviews (pre-recorded)
 Hal Holbrook
 Richard Gilliland
 Gerald McRaney
 Pamela Norris

Reception
The Designing Women Reunion was the second highest-rated special in Lifetime network's 19-year history, averaging a 3.1 household rating (3.3 million viewers) during its premiere on July 28, 2003, the first being The Golden Girls: Their Greatest Moments which scored a 3.7 rating with 4.2 million viewers the previous month.

The "Designing Women" evening on Lifetime from 7:00 to 11:00 p.m., which included an Intimate Portrait of Delta Burke, the 90-minute reunion special, the pilot episode and two episodes of Designing Women especially selected by the cast, was seen by an estimated 9.7 million viewers.

References

External links

Designing Women
2003 television specials
2000s American television specials
Television series reunion specials
English-language television shows
Lifetime (TV network) films
Films directed by Harry Thomason